Hermann Schmitz (16 May 1928 – 5 May 2021) was a German philosopher who founded neo-phenomenology. He was a professor at the University of Kiel.

References

1928 births
2021 deaths
German philosophers
University of Bonn alumni
Academic staff of the University of Kiel
People from Leipzig